The Bosnia and Herzegovina women's national basketball team represents Bosnia and Herzegovina in international women's basketball competitions, and is governed by the Basketball Federation of Bosnia and Herzegovina. Before the independence in 1992, Bosnian players played for Yugoslavia.

Bosnia and Herzegovina's best result in international competitions so far is a gold medal at the 1993 Mediterranean Games where they beat Italy in the finals. It was also the first major competition the country played in since becoming an independent state. 

In 1997 Bosnia and Herzegovina qualified for the first time to EuroBasket winning all six qualifying games and finishing as number one in the group stage. They were later eliminated in the preliminary round of the tournament.                                                                                        

Two years later, in 1999 Bosnia and Herzegovina qualified for the second time in a row to EuroBasket. However they were eliminated once in again in the preliminary round, winning only one of seven games. 

In 2021, almost 22 years later, Bosnia and Herzegovina qualified once again to the EuroBasket after making a huge upset in the qualifiers, finishing second. For the first time in Bosnia and Herzegovina's history at EuroBasket they advanced from the group stages, but were later eliminated in the quarterfinals against France with a result of 80–67. They finished the tournament as 5th.

Competitive record
For the results before 1992 see Yugoslavia women's national basketball team.

Olympic Games

World Championship

EuroBasket

Mediterranean Games

Team

Current roster
Roster for the 2022 FIBA Women's Basketball World Cup.

Notable players
Current notable players from Bosnia and Herzegovina:

References

External links

FIBA profile

 
Women's national basketball teams